Vriesea incurvata is a plant species in the genus Vriesea. This species is endemic to Brazil.

Cultivars
 Vriesea 'Albertii'
 Vriesea 'California Orange'
 Vriesea 'Eclatant'
 Vriesea 'Flammeche'
 Vriesea 'Fulgida'
 Vriesea 'Gloriosa'
 Vriesea 'L'eclatant'
 Vriesea 'Marcella'
 Vriesea 'Marechaliana'
 Vriesea 'Margaritae'
 Vriesea 'President Oscar Lamarche'
 Vriesea 'Rostrum Aquilae'
 Vriesea 'Seminole Chief'
 Vriesea 'Souvenir de Joseph Mawet'
 Vriesea 'Splendida'
 Vriesea 'Van Geertii'
 × Guzvriesea 'Elata'

References

BSI Cultivar Registry Retrieved 11 October 2009

incurvata
Flora of Brazil